LNK or lnk is a three letter acronym that has several meanings:

IATA airport code for Lincoln Airport, Nebraska, US
Amtrak station code for Lincoln, Nebraska (Amtrak station)
LNK (television station), Lithuania
.lnk, a computer file extension

See also 
 WinLNK.Agent